Cairo Governorate is one of the 27 governorates of Egypt. It is formed of the city of Cairo, both the national capital of Egypt and the governorate's, in addition to five satellite cities: the New Administrative Capital - set to become the seat of national government, New Cairo, Shourok, Badr, Capital Gardens, and 15th of May. These cities form almost half of the Greater Cairo metropolitan area by population.

As one of three city-states in Egypt, where the Cairo governor is also the head of the city. This rightfully creates much confusion and synonymity between the Governorate of Cairo, and the city, though officially they are two semidistinct levels of local government,  and as with other governorates, the governor is appointed by the president.

Overview
Parts of the governorate - the Helwan district and the satellite cities, were spun off in April 2008 to form the Helwan Governorate, only to be reincorporated into the Cairo Governorate in April 2011.

Municipal divisions
The governorate is divided into the city of Cairo, and the unallocated desert hinter land (al-zahir al-sahrawi). 

Cairo city is subdivided into four Areas (manatiq) headed by a deputy governor each, and 38 Districts (ahya', sing. Hayy) with their own governor appointed heads. Some districts are represented by one police station (qism, plr. aqsam), while others may be subdivided by two or more.

The Northern Area divided into 8 Districts:

Shubra, Al-Zawiya al-Hamra, Hadayek al-Kobba, Rod al-Farg, al-Sharabiya, al-Sahel, al-Zaytoun, and Al-Amiriya

The Eastern Area divided into 9 Districts:

Misr al-Gadidah (Heliopolis), Al-Nozha, Nasr City East (Sharq Madinet Nasr), Nasr City West (Gharb Madinet Nasr), al-Salam Awwal, al-Salam Thani, al-Matariya, and al-Marg.

The Western Area divided into 9 Districts:

Manshiyat Nasser, Al-Wayli, Wasat al-Qahira (Qism: Al-Darb al-Ahmar, al-Gamaliyya, al-Hussein), Boulaq, Gharb El-Qahira (Zamalek, Garden City, Down Town), Abdeen, Al-Azbakiya, al-Muski, and Bab El-Shaaria.

The Southern Area divided into 12 Districts:

In addition to Cairo City, there are five satellite cities that are under the jurisdiction of the Minister of Housing, Utilities and Urban Communities who chairs the New Urban Communities Authority that directly controls them (planning, land sales, zoning), while the governorate departments (muduriyat) control police and select public services (education, health, subsidised food). The more populated ones are subdivided into qisms, while the ones still under construction are yet to have governorate representation. These cities are:

New Cairo (Qism 1,2,3)

Badr (Qism

15th of May (Qism

New Administrative Capital (Under construction)

Capital Gardens (Under construction)

As of July 2017, the municipal divisions had a total estimated population as of 9,570,441.

Governors

Current

On 30 August 2018, Khaled Abdel-Aal Abdel-Hafez was appointed governor of Cairo Governorate.

Former

 Atef Abdelhamid, 7 September 2016 - 12 August 2018
 Galal Mustafa Said, 13 August 2013 - 23 March 2016
 Osama Kamal, 29 January 2013 - 12 August 2013
 Abdel Kawi Khalifa, 14 April 2011 - 12 August 2012
 Abdel Azim Wazir, 9 July 2004 - 14 April 2011
 Abdel Rehim Shehata, 8 July 1997 - 14 July 2004
 Mohammed Omar Abdel Akhar, 2 May 1991 - 7 July 1997
 Mahmoud Sherif, 18 April 1989 - 19 May 1991
 Yousef Sabri Abu Taleb, 13 March 1983 - 14 April 1989
 Mohammed Saad El-Din Maamoun, 15 May 1977 - 12 March 1983

Industrial zones
According to the Egyptian Governing Authority for Investment and Free Zones (GAFI), in affiliation with the Ministry of Investment (MOI), the following industrial zones are located in this governorate:
Torah and Shaq Al Tho'ban
South Helwan 
Katamia 
Shaq Al Tho'ban 
Al Robeky 
Al Maasara 
Division Maadi Company for Development and Reconstruction
Egypt-Ismailia. Road - Al Nozha District
El Salam City 
El Marg District 
El Sharabya District 
(New urban community industrial zone) Badr City 
(New urban community industrial zone) 15 May 
(New urban community industrial zone) New Cairo
(New urban community industrial zone) Al Shrouk

Due to its congestion and overcrowded streets, Cairo is not attractive to investors. UN-Habitat is promoting alternative methods of transportation with the aim of relieving these issues.

Projects and programs
In a program that began on 28 August 2012 (through 2018), the European Union invested 40 million Euros on upgrading the infrastructure of informal areas in Cairo Governorate.

See also 
 Governorates of Egypt
 Greater Cairo

References

External links
Cairo Governorate Official website (in Arabic and English)

 
Governorates of Egypt